The Southern Monon Conference was an IHSAA-sanctioned conference in Southern Indiana. The conference was named after the two railroad lines the four founding schools were located along: the Southern (Milltown) and Monon (Borden, Campbellsburg, and Pekin). The conference doubled in size in its second year, yet had a large amount of turnover in its existence, The conference ended in 1965, when it merged with the Dixie Athletic Conference to form the Dixie-Monon Conference (Milltown left the league in 1959, ending the presence of the Southern Railroad its footprint).

Membership

 Played concurrently in SMC and WCC 1957–58.
 Played concurrently in SMC and CCC 1957–59.
 Played concurrently in SMC and LCC throughout SMC tenure. 
 Played concurrently in SMC and JCC 1959–65.

References

Indiana high school athletic conferences
High school sports conferences and leagues in the United States
Indiana High School Athletic Association disestablished conferences